George Haslam (born 23 March 1898 – 13 August 1980) was an English footballer who played as a centre-half. Born in Turton, Lancashire, he began his career with Darwen before joining Manchester United in May 1921, signed along with John Howarth for a combined fee of £750. He made his debut nine months later in a 1–1 draw at home to Birmingham City on 25 February 1922. In just over six seasons with Manchester United, Haslam made just 27 appearances for the first team, although he was a regular for the reserves, whom he captained to second place in The Central League in 1926–27. In April 1927, he shared a benefit match against Sunderland with club veterans Lal Hilditch and Jack Silcock. Haslam was transferred to Portsmouth for a fee of £2,500 in November 1927, but left at the end of the season, returning to Lancashire to play for Cheshire County League side Ashton National. He became something of a journeyman in his later career, playing no more than a season for each of Whitchurch, Lancaster Town, Chorley, Burscough Rangers and Northwich Victoria.

References

External links
Profile at StretfordEnd.co.uk
Profile at MUFCInfo.com

1898 births
1980 deaths
English footballers
Manchester United F.C. players
Darwen F.C. players
Portsmouth F.C. players
People from Turton
Association football midfielders